John Caius (born John Kays ; 6 October 1510 – 29 July 1573), also known as Johannes Caius and Ioannes Caius, was an English physician, and second founder of Gonville and Caius College, Cambridge.

Biography

Early years
Caius was born in Norwich and was educated at Norwich School. In 1529, he was admitted as a student at Gonville Hall, Cambridge, founded by Edmund Gonville in 1348, where he seems to have mainly studied divinity.

After graduating in 1533, he visited Italy, where he studied under Montanus and Vesalius at Padua. In 1541 he took his degree as a physician at the University of Padua.

In 1543 he visited several parts of Italy, Germany and France and then returned to England. Upon his return from Italy he Latinised his surname which was somewhat fashionable at the time.

Career

Caius was a physician in London in 1547, and was admitted as a fellow of the College of Physicians, of which he was for many years president.

In 1557 Caius, at that time physician to Queen Mary, enlarged the foundation of his old college, changed the name from "Gonville Hall" to "Gonville and Caius College", and endowed it with several considerable estates, adding an entire new court at the expense of £1,834. He accepted the mastership of the college 24 January 1559 on the death of Thomas Bacon, and held it until about a month before his own death.

He was physician to Edward VI, Queen Mary and Queen Elizabeth. From this position he was dismissed in 1568 on account of his adherence to the Roman Catholic faith. He was incongruously accused both of atheism, and of keeping secretly a collection of ornaments and vestments for Roman Catholic use. The latter were found and burned in the college court.

He was elected nine times president of the College of Physicians, an account of which, Annales collegii medicorum 1520-1565, he left in manuscript.

He returned to Cambridge from London for a few days in June 1573, about a month before his death, and resigned the mastership to Thomas Legge, a tutor at Jesus College. He died at his London house, in St Bartholomew's Hospital, on 29 July 1573, but his body was brought to Cambridge, and buried in the chapel under the monument which he had designed.

The question of whether he was the inspiration for the character of Dr Caius in Shakespeare's play the Merry Wives of Windsor has been discussed at length by Arnold McNair, 1st Baron McNair.

Legacy
Caius was a learned, active and benevolent man. In 1557 he erected a monument in St Paul's Cathedral to the memory of Thomas Linacre. In 1564, he obtained a grant for Gonville and Caius College to take the bodies of two malefactors annually for dissection; he was thus an important pioneer in advancing the science of anatomy. He probably devised, and certainly presented, the silver caduceus now in the possession of Caius College as part of its insignia. He first gave it to the College of Physicians, and afterwards presented the London College with another.

Works
Caius was also a pioneer naturalist, prepared to make his own observations about nature rather than simply relying on accepted authorities. He was ready to make journeys about the country to see and record unusual animals. As such he could be considered also a pioneer of zoology, not yet recognised as a separate science.

He corresponded with the Swiss naturalist Conrad Gesner, with whom he had made friends while returning from Padua. He wrote a study of British dogs to send to Gesner as a contribution (not used) to Gesner's Historiae animalium, and also sent Gesner drawings of dogs, which were printed in later editions of Gesner's work. Caius' Catholic religious convictions did not prevent his friendship with the Protestant Gesner (indeed, the Historiae Animalium, to which Caius contributed, was under Pope Paul IV placed on the Roman Catholic Church's list of prohibited books).

His last literary production was a history of Cambridge University, Historia Cantabrigiensis Academiae (London, 1574).

Bibliography

Annals of the College from 1555 to 1572
Translation of several of Galen's works, printed at different times abroad.
Hippocrates de Medicamentis, first discovered and published by Dr Caius; also De Ratsone Vicius (Lov. 1556, 8vo)
De Mendeti Methodo (Basel, 1554; London, 1556, Svo)
 Reprint: 
A Boke or Counseill against the Disease Called the Sweate, London 1552
 Reprint: 
Reprint: Caius, John, A Boke or Counseill against the Disease Called the Sweate, London 1552. Facsimile ed., 1937, Scholars' Facsimiles & Reprints, .
De Ephemera Britannica (Account of the Sweating Sickness in England) (London, 1556, 1721)
 Reprint: 
History of the University of Cambridge (London, 1568, 8vo; 1574, 4to, in Latin)
 Reprint: 
De Thermis Britannicis; but it is doubtful whether this work was ever printed
De Rariorum animalium atque stirpium historia, libellus.(Of Some Rare Plants and Animals) (London, 1570)
 Reprint: 
 Digital text: 
De Canibus Britannicis (1570, 1729)
 Reprint: 
Of Englishe Dogges: The Diuersities, the Names, the Natures, and the Properties (London, 1576).
 Reprint: 
De Libris suis: De Libris propriis (London, 1570).
 Reprint: 
De Pronunciatione Graecae et Latinae Linguae (London, 1574)
 Reprint: 
 Digital text:

See also
 Thomas Caius, Master of University College, Oxford (1561–1572)
 Bloodhound

Notes

References

Further reading

External links
John Caius on the Gonville and Caius College website
 
 
 
  (this anthology lacks global pagination)

Academics from Norwich
People educated at Norwich School
Alumni of Gonville and Caius College, Cambridge
Fellows of Gonville and Caius College, Cambridge
Founders of Gonville and Caius College, Cambridge
Masters of Gonville and Caius College, Cambridge
History of anatomy
University of Padua alumni
16th-century English medical doctors
1510 births
1573 deaths
Presidents of the Royal College of Physicians
Medical doctors from Norwich
Founders of colleges of the University of Cambridge